The Vienna Open (currently sponsored by Erste Bank and called the Erste Bank Open) is a professional tennis tournament played on indoor hard courts. Originally an event of the Grand Prix tennis circuit (1974–1989), it is currently part of the ATP World Tour 500 series of the Association of Tennis Professionals (ATP) World Tour. It is held annually at the Wiener Stadthalle, in Vienna, Austria, since 1974.

The event was also known as the Stadthalle Open, and as the Fischer-Grand Prix from 1976 to 1985, as the CA-TennisTrophy from 1986 to 2003, as the BA-CA-TennisTrophy from 2004 to 2007 and as the Bank Austria TennisTrophy from 2008 to 2010, before being renamed to Erste Bank Open in 2011.

Austria's most successful tennis player, Thomas Muster, never won the Vienna Open, but was a runner-up on three occasions (1988, 1993, 1995), and a semi-finalist on another four occasions (1987, 1989, 1990, 1994). Three Austrian players have won the singles title at the Vienna Open: Horst Skoff in 1988, Jürgen Melzer in both 2009 and 2010, and Dominic Thiem in 2019.

Past finals

Singles

Doubles

Notelist

References

External links
  
 ATP World Tour tournament profile

 
Hard court tennis tournaments
Indoor tennis tournaments
Tennis tournaments in Austria